Lavoslav Vukelić (Bočaj, near Gornji Kosinj, Austrian Empire, 20 March 1840 - Sveti Križ Začretje, Austria-Hungary, 26 March 1879) was a Croatian  translator

Biography
Lavoslav Vukelić was born in the noble family Vukelić whose ancestors had long ago moved to Lika from Dalmatia with many others and converted to Roman Catholicism. Vukelić completed his elementary and secondary school in Senj. Then he went to Vienna to pursue a management course on a stipend from the Military Frontier authorities. After that, he returned to Lika, where he served as an officer in many places. In his senior years, he was transferred to Sveti Križ Začretje as an officer. There he appointed prefect secretary.

He is an author of 79 songs which were collected by Bude Budisavljević in a  booklet entitled Književno cvieće, "Literary Flowers". Also, he translated works by English, German, Polish, Russian, Italian and Slovenian authors. The most important are his translations of Shakespeare, Goethe, Gottfried August Bürger, Heine, Mickiewicz, Lermontov, and Pushkin.

Works
 Literary Glossary of Lavoslav Vukelić, Zagreb, 1882 (Bude Budisavljević);
 Literary Flower / Lavoslav Vukelić, collected (Buda Budisavljević, Zagreb, 1884)
 Selected Works / Franjo Marković, Lavoslav Vukelić, Andrija Palmović, Rikard Jorgovanić, Five Centuries of Croatian Literature, Vol. 44, Zagreb, 1970 (compiled by Nedjeljko Mihanovic)

See also
 Petar Preradović
 August Harambašić
 Ognjeslav Utješenović
 Dimitrija Demeter

References 

1840 births
1879 deaths
19th-century Croatian poets
Croatian translators
Croatian people of Serbian descent
Translators of Johann Wolfgang von Goethe
Translators of William Shakespeare